Ampato (possibly from Quechua hamp'atu or from Aymara jamp'atu, both meaning "frog") is a dormant  stratovolcano in the Andes of southern Peru.

Ampato consists of three volcanic cones, which lie on top of an older eroded volcanic edifice. They were formed sequentially by extrusion of lava flows, but Ampato has also had explosive eruptions which have deposited ash, lapilli and pumice in the surrounding landscape. One young lava flow has been dated to 17,000 ± 6,000 years before present, but a summit lava dome is even younger, and Holocene ash layers in surrounding peat bogs may testify to the occurrence of recent eruptions.

The present-day volcano is covered by an ice cap, and during the last glacial maximum glaciers advanced to low altitudes. In 1995, an Inca mummy known as Mummy Juanita was discovered on Ampato by Johan Reinhard; it had been offered as a human sacrifice more than six hundred years earlier on the mountain.

Geography and geomorphology 

Ampato lies south of the Colca Canyon and at the southern end of a chain of volcanoes formed by Hualca Hualca and Sabancaya, the last of which has been historically active.

Ampato is part of the Central Volcanic Zone of the Andes, which in Peru manifests itself as several dozen Pleistocene volcanoes, some of which erupted in historical time including El Misti, Huaynaputina, Sabancaya and Ubinas. The largest historical eruption of the Andes took place at Huaynaputina. Other volcanoes in the Peruvian Central Volcanic Zone are Sara Sara, Solimana, Coropuna, Chachani, Ticsani, Tutupaca, Yucamane and Casiri.

The volcano Ampato consists of three individual steep-sided cones which rise from a gentle glacially eroded foot. Ampato is one of the highest volcanoes in the Central Volcanic Zone and the 35th highest summit in the Andes.

The summit of the volcano is covered with an ice cap, and the edifice is incised by glacial valleys.

Geology 

This subduction process is responsible for volcanism in the Central Volcanic Zone and started during the Jurassic period after the opening of the southern Atlantic Ocean, which triggered the onset of subduction of the Nazca Plate.

Volcanic arc-associated volcanism originally occurred within the Cordillera de la Costa in the Jurassic, but later it migrated resulting in the emplacement of the Tacaza and Toquepala groups and finally the Neogene Barroso group. The present-day volcanic arc is situated in the area of the Barroso group but has a narrower extent.

The basement beneath Ampato is formed by sedimentary and volcanic rocks of the Western Cordillera of Peru, and the rocks are of Mesozoic to Cenozoic age. A high plateau formed by ignimbrites and lavas of Pliocene to Miocene age rises above this basement. The terrain is cut by several different fault systems; one of these, the northeastward striking Sepina fault has been seismically active in the 20th and 21st centuries and seems to have controlled the development of the Ampato and Sabancaya volcanoes.

Composition 

Ampato has erupted different volcanic rocks at different stages, with the earliest ones generating andesite and dacite and which define a potassium-rich suite. The rocks contain amphibole, biotite, iron oxide, olivine, plagioclase, pyroxene and titanium oxide.

Processes such as fractional crystallization, magma mixing and the absorption of crustal material by developing magmas have been invoked to explain the formation of the magmas of both Ampato and Sabancaya. Estimating the rate of magma production at Ampato is difficult owing to the uncertainties in determining the volume of the edifice and the duration of repose times between eruptions; on average it appears to be . This rate does not consider "spurt"-like behaviour; volcano growth in fits and spurts has been observed at many other volcanic arc volcanoes. The rate is about one order of magnitude less than at neighbouring Sabancaya volcano.

Vegetation 

The Western Cordillera features various climate zones, such as the quechua and suni zones. The vegetation that occurs at high altitudes is dominated by pioneer plants, with wetlands constituting additional centres of biodiversity.

Eruptive history 

Above this formation, another pile of dacitic lava flows constructed the first Ampato edifice, which was about the same size as the present-day volcano.

The southern cone developed in several different stages; a first stage generated lava flows emanating from the summit; dating of two such flows has produced ages of 34,000 ± 8,000 and 40,000 ± 3,000 years before present.

Either during or before the last glacial maximum, Ampato erupted tephra during multiple explosive eruptions which today is preserved in two units, the Baylillas and the Corinta deposits. The first consists of lapilli, pumice and scoria and individual layers form thick sequences at large distances from the volcano, but are heavily eroded and thus difficult to measure in extent. Scoria flows identified on the southwestern-southern flanks of Ampato correspond to this unit.
The central cone grew in the gap between the northern and southern edifice and consists of lava flows again of andesitic to dacitic composition. A dacitic summit lava dome is not affected by glacial erosion and appears to be the youngest eruption product of Ampato.

Early Holocene (11,000 - 8,000 years before present) ash layers in peat bogs around the volcano may have originated either on Ampato or on Sabancaya. Late Holocene tephra layers dated to 1,790 ± 110, 2,050 ± 70 and 4,500 ± 125 likewise may have been erupted from Ampato, but Sabancaya is a more likely source for these ash layers.

Hazards 

Presently, Ampato is considered to be a dormant volcano. Potential hazards from future eruptions at Ampato are lahars induced by melting of the icecap and sub-Plinian eruptions, considering the history of explosive eruptions at this volcano.

The Peruvian geological service has published a hazard map that describes danger areas of both Ampato and Sabancaya. Pyroclastic fallout primarily threatens the vicinity of the volcano but large eruptions can result in fallout over large areas around the volcanic complex.

Human history 

Ampato was the site of human sacrifice during Inca times, around 1466 the Mummy Juanita was offered for sacrifice on the mountain, along with two other girls and a boy. The sacrifice took place on a platform on the summit of the volcano and was presumably intended to calm the mountain spirits during an eruption of the neighbouring volcano Sabancaya. The mummies were discovered in 1995 by Johan Reinhard and colleagues on the summit of the mountain.

Such sacrifices with children being the usual subjects are known as capacocha and the discoveries of their mummies on mountains in the Andes has gained them a lot of attention. The process served to tie the Inka empire more closely together, since children to be sacrificed were selected from the entire realm and the children adorned and their names remembered after the sacrifice.

See also

 Ananta

References

Sources

Further reading 
 Reinhard, Johan The Ice Maiden: Inca Mummies, Mountain Gods, and Sacred Sites in the Andes. 2005, Washington, D.C.: National Geographic Society.
 
 
  (in Spanish; also includes volcanoes of Argentina, Bolivia, and Peru)

External links
 Ampato on Summitpost

Stratovolcanoes of Peru
Mountains of Arequipa Region
Andean Volcanic Belt
Subduction volcanoes
Mountains of Peru
Six-thousanders of the Andes